This article lists the Independent Labour Party's election results in UK parliamentary elections.

Summary of general election performance

Election results

By-elections, 1893–1895

1895 general election

By-elections, 1895–1900

1900 general election

Hardie stood for two seats.  All candidates other than Hempsall stood as part of the Labour Representation Committee.  Clarke ran as a joint Independent Labour Party-Social Democratic Federation candidate.  The list does not include Alfred Ewen Fletcher, who was supported by the ILP but ran for the Scottish Workers' Representation Committee.

By-elections, 1900–1906

All candidates stood as part of the Labour Representation Committee.

1906 general election

All candidates other than Burgess and Newlove stood as part of the Labour Representation Committee.  Only ILP members sponsored by the party are listed.

By-elections, 1906–1910

All candidates other than Bramley stood for the Labour Party.  Only candidates sponsored by the ILP are listed.

January 1910 general election

All candidates stood as part of the Labour Party.  Only ILP members sponsored by the party are listed.

December 1910 general election

All candidates stood as part of the Labour Party.

By-elections, 1910–1918

All candidates except Williams and Bland (in 1918) stood for the Labour Party.

1918 general election

All candidates stood for the Labour Party.

By-elections, 1918–1922

All candidates stood for the Labour Party.

1922 general election

All candidates stood for the Labour Party.

By-elections, 1922–1923

Candidate stood for the Labour Party.

1923 UK general election

All candidates stood for the Labour Party.

By-elections, 1923–1924

Candidate stood for the Labour Party.

1924 general election

Candidates stood for the Labour Party.

By-elections, 1924–1929
{| class="wikitable sortable"
! By-election !! Candidate !! Votes !! % !! Position
|-
|1924 Dundee by-election ||  || 22,973 || 69.2 || 1
|-
|1925 Ayr Burghs by-election ||  || 9,787 || 35.2 || 2
|-
|1928 Linlithgowshire by-election ||  || 14,446 || 49.1 || 1<ref name="lab28by">Labour Party, "Report of the Annual Labour Party Conference (1928), pp. 11–17</ref>
|-
|1928 Aberdeen North by-election ||  || 10,646 || 52.5 || 1
|-
|1929 North Lanarkshire by-election ||  || 15,711 || 57.5 || 1
|}

Candidates stood for the Labour Party.

1929 general election

All candidates stood as part of the Labour Party.

By-elections 1929–1931

All candidates except Irwin were endorsed by the Labour Party.  Irwin was sponsored by the United Society of Boilermakers.

1931 general election

In addition, Josiah Wedgwood was elected unopposed for Newcastle-under-Lyme.  Only those ILP members not accredited by the Labour Party are listed.

By-elections, 1931–1935

1935 general election

By-elections, 1935–1945

1945 general election

By-elections, 1945–1950

1950 general election

By-elections, 1950–1951

1951 general election

1955 general election

By-elections, 1955–1959

1959 general election

By-elections, 1959–1964

1966 general election

1970 general election

February 1974 general election

References

F. W. S. Craig, Chronology of British Parliamentary By-elections 1833–1987''

Independent Labour Party
Election results by party in the United Kingdom